Pleasant Lake is a  lake in the town of New London, Merrimack County, New Hampshire, United States. The village of Elkins is located at the east end of the lake, next to its outlet. Water from Pleasant Lake flows east to the Blackwater River, a tributary of the Contoocook River, and ultimately the Merrimack River.

Fishing
The lake is classified as a cold- and warmwater fishery, with observed species including brook trout, landlocked salmon, smallmouth bass, chain pickerel, and horned pout. The state record landlocked salmon was caught in Pleasant Lake in 1914 (36", 18 lb, 8 oz).

Island
There is an island on the lake which on old maps has the name "Granite Friends Island" but is better known today as "Blueberry Island." It is a destination for boaters and a picnickers.

Beaches
Elkins Beach is a New London town beach, which, like the village of Elkins, is located near the outlet of Pleasant Lake. This beach is the primary swimming location on the lake for town residents and their families.

See also

List of lakes in New Hampshire

References

Lakes of Merrimack County, New Hampshire
Lakes of New Hampshire
New London, New Hampshire